Kepler-23b is an exoplanet orbiting Kepler-23, located in the Cygnus constellation. The exoplanet was discovered with the Kepler space telescope in January 2012.

The planet is bigger than Earth, and its orbit is very close to its parent star.  Orbital periods are 7.1 days and it presents a semi-major axis 0.099 AU.

References

See  also
List of planets discovered by the Kepler spacecraft

Exoplanets discovered in 2012
Exoplanets discovered by the Kepler space telescope
Cygnus (constellation)